The Mechanized Infantry Regiment (MIR) is a mechanized infantry regiment of the Sri Lanka Army. It is made up of four regular battalions and a volunteer battalion. Establish in 2007 by Lt. Gen. Sarath Fonseka its battalions are equipped with Type 63 and WZ551 armoured personnel carriers make up the Mechanized Infantry Brigade. It is the youngest Infantry regiment of the Army.

History

The Mechanized Infantry Regiment was raised on the battlefield on 14 February at the divisional headquarters of the 53 Division at Kodikamam, Jaffna in order for the army to have specialized mechanized infantry units to deploy in battle, instead of using regular infantry along with armoured personnel carriers as it had done before. Three battalions where formed with officers and men from 3rd Light Infantry Battalion, 10th Sri Lanka Sinha Regiment, the 4th Gajaba Battalion and 5th & 6th Reconnaissance Regiments of the Sri Lanka Armoured Corps.

The 53-4 brigade which is made up of the newly formed battalions has since been designated as the Mechanized Infantry Brigade.

Units

Brigade
Mechanized Infantry Brigade

Regular Battalions
1st Mechanized Infantry Battalion
2nd Mechanized Infantry Battalion
3rd Mechanized Infantry Battalion
4th Mechanized Infantry Battalion

Volunteer Battalions
5th Mechanized Infantry Battalion (Converted from 21st Sri Lanka National Guard on 1 June 2010)

Order of precedence

See also
Sri Lanka Army

References

External links and sources
 Sri Lanka Army

M
Mechanized units and formations
Military units and formations established in 2007